In mathematics, the tangent space of a manifold generalizes to higher dimensions the notion of tangent planes to surfaces in three dimensions and tangent lines to curves in two dimensions. In the context of physics the  tangent space to a manifold at a point can be viewed as the space of possible velocities for a particle moving on the manifold.

Informal description 

In differential geometry, one can attach to every point  of a differentiable manifold a tangent space—a real vector space that intuitively contains the possible directions in which one can tangentially pass through . This is a generalization of the notion of a vector, based at a given initial point, in a Euclidean space. The dimension of the tangent space at every point of a connected manifold is the same as that of the manifold itself.

For example, if the given manifold is a -sphere, then one can picture the tangent space at a point as the plane that touches the sphere at that point and is perpendicular to the sphere's radius through the point. More generally, if a given manifold is thought of as an embedded submanifold of Euclidean space, then one can picture a tangent space in this literal fashion. This was the traditional approach toward defining parallel transport. Many authors in differential geometry and general relativity use it. More strictly, this defines an affine tangent space, which is distinct from the space of tangent vectors described by modern terminology.

In algebraic geometry, in contrast, there is an intrinsic definition of the tangent space at a point of an algebraic variety  that gives a vector space with dimension at least that of  itself. For example, a curve that crosses itself does not have a unique tangent line at that point. See Zariski tangent space.

Once the tangent spaces of a manifold have been introduced, one can define vector fields, which are abstractions of the velocity field of particles moving in space. A vector field attaches to every point of the manifold a vector from the tangent space at that point, in a smooth manner. Such a vector field serves to define a generalized ordinary differential equation on a manifold: A solution to such a differential equation is a differentiable curve on the manifold whose derivative at any point is equal to the tangent vector attached to that point by the vector field.

All the tangent spaces of a manifold may be "glued together" to form a new differentiable manifold with twice the dimension of the original manifold, called the tangent bundle of the manifold.

Formal definitions 

The informal description above relies on a manifold's ability to be embedded into an ambient vector space  so that the tangent vectors can "stick out" of the manifold into the ambient space. However, it is more convenient to define the notion of a tangent space based solely on the manifold itself.

There are various equivalent ways of defining the tangent spaces of a manifold. While the definition via the velocity of curves is intuitively the simplest, it is also the most cumbersome to work with. More elegant and abstract approaches are described below.

Definition via tangent curves 

In the embedded-manifold picture, a tangent vector at a point  is thought of as the velocity of a curve passing through the point .

Suppose that  is a  differentiable manifold (with smoothness ) and that . Pick a coordinate chart , where  is an open subset of  containing .

Again, one needs to check that this construction does not depend on the particular chart  and the curve  being used, and in fact it does not.

Definition via derivations 

Suppose now that  is a  manifold. A real-valued function  is said to belong to  if and only if for every coordinate chart , the map  is infinitely differentiable. Note that  is a real associative algebra with respect to the pointwise product and sum of functions and scalar multiplication.

which is modeled on the product rule of calculus.

(For every identically constant function  it follows that ).

Denote  the set of all derivations at  Setting
  and
 
turns  into a vector space.

Generalizations 
Generalizations of this definition are possible, for instance, to complex manifolds and algebraic varieties. However, instead of examining derivations  from the full algebra of functions, one must instead work at the level of germs of functions. The reason for this is that the structure sheaf may not be fine for such structures. For example, let  be an algebraic variety with structure sheaf .

Equivalence of the definitions 
One can ascertain that  is a derivation at the point  and that equivalent curves yield the same derivation. Thus, for an equivalence class  we can define  where the curve  has been chosen arbitrarily. The map  is a vector space isomorphism between the space of the equivalence classes  and that of the derivations at the point

Definition via cotangent spaces  

Again, we start with a  manifold  and a point .

While this definition is the most abstract, it is also the one that is most easily transferable to other settings, for instance, to the varieties considered in algebraic geometry.

This yields an equivalence between tangent spaces defined via derivations and tangent spaces defined via cotangent spaces.

Properties 

Tangent vectors as directional derivatives 

Another way to think about tangent vectors is as directional derivatives.

Hence, there is a one-to-one correspondence between vectors (thought of as tangent vectors at a point) and derivations at a point.

As tangent vectors to a general manifold at a point can be defined as derivations at that point, it is natural to think of them as directional derivatives.

Basis of the tangent space at a point 

Then for every tangent vector , one has

This formula therefore expresses  as a linear combination of the basis tangent vectors  defined by the coordinate chart .

The derivative of a map 

Every smooth (or differentiable) map  between smooth (or differentiable) manifolds induces natural linear maps between their corresponding tangent spaces:

If the tangent space is defined via differentiable curves, then this map is defined by

If, instead, the tangent space is defined via derivations, then this map is defined by

It is frequently expressed using a variety of other notations:

In a sense, the derivative is the best linear approximation to  near . Note that when , then the map  coincides with the usual notion of the differential of the function .

An important result regarding the derivative map is the following:

This is a generalization of the inverse function theorem to maps between manifolds.

See also 
 Coordinate-induced basis
 Cotangent space
 Differential geometry of curves
 Exponential map
 Vector space

Notes

References 
 .
 .
 .

External links
 Tangent Planes at MathWorld

Differential topology
Differential geometry